The table below is a medal classified table of every motorcycle speedway rider to have finished in the top three of a Speedway World Cup competition. In total, 79 different riders from 6 national teams have a SWC medal(s). Updated after the 2016 Speedway World Cup Final.

Classification

See also 
 Speedway World Championship Classification

!